Stand Up NY is a comedy club located in Manhattan’s Upper West Side on 236 West 78th street. Founded in 1986, the club is one of New York City’s oldest, always featuring diverse lineups of well-known and local comedians. Comedians Chris Rock, Jerry Seinfeld, and Jon Stewart performed here. Past performers at Stand-Up New York include: Louis C.K., Susie Essman, Mike Birbiglia, Lewis Black, Judah Friedlander, John Oliver, Jay Oakerson, Hannibal Buress, Godfrey, Dave Attell, Anthony Jeselnik, Aziz Ansari, and Amy Schumer.

Originally owned by then television writer and producer, now Broadway performer Cary Hoffman, the club was bought as it was struggling financially in 2008 by Dani Zoldan and Gabe Waldman, who both frequented the club as teenagers. The two immediately employed prominent interior designer Steve Lewis for the roomy, 110 seat space, composed of both a bar and showroom. Within ten months of Zoldan and Waldman taking over, revenue had tripled.

The club is now owned by former hedge fund manager James Altucher, who wrote a post on LinkedIn  on August 13th 2020 stating that “NYC is dead forever” as a result of the Covid-19 pandemic and was subsequently called a “putz” by comedian Jerry Seinfeld in an op-ed in The New York Times.

The club offers shows seven days a week with a showcase format, meaning each of the five to seven comedians performs for 10-20 minutes. A regular week will consist of two shows Sunday through Thursday, three shows on Friday, and four shows on Saturday. Stand Up New York also hosts open-mics every weekday and rents out the venue for private events.

In February of 2012, comedian Chris Rock made an impromptu appearance at the club, hoping to test out new material before presenting at the Academy Awards. Rock could be overheard consoling comedian Jodie Wasserman, whom Rock had bumped from the line-up, saying, “Sorry about that, but I’m presenting at the Oscars.”

Actor Zach Galifianakis once worked as a night manager at Stand Up NY. After learning this in May 2013, club owner Dani Zoldan jokingly tweeted at Galifianakis, asking if the Hangover star would be available to work a shift the following night. Much to Zoldan's surprise, Galifianakis visited the club alone that night. Although the actor turned down an offer to take the stage, Galifianakis stuck around to watch a show and was seen sitting at the bar.

In early 2013, Stand-Up NY started a new venture called Stand Up NY Labs: a place where free comedy podcasts and videos are produced featuring comedians affiliated with Stand-Up NY.

Located directly above the club, the Stand Up NY Labs records podcasts such as "Tuesdays with Stories" with Joe List and Mark Normand, "Charlie Murphy Presents" with Charlie Murphy, "We Know Nothing" with Nikki Glaser, "Race Wars" with Kurt Metzger and Sherrod Small, "My Sexy Podcast" with Sabrina Jalees, and "Invasion of Privacy" with Joe Santagato and Kate Wolff.

References

External links
Stand Up NY official site
Stand Up NY Labs official site

Comedy clubs in Manhattan
Upper West Side